Harry Ronald Stone (born September 9, 1942) is an American retired professional baseball player.

A native of Corning, California, Stone attended San Joaquin Delta College and California State University, Sacramento. He played 11 seasons (1963–73) in pro baseball after signing with the Baltimore Orioles. Then he was returned to the Baltimore organization, where he toiled for 2 more seasons in the minor leagues. The Orioles traded him to the Phillies for Clay Dalrymple on January 21, 1969.

In Philadelphia, he spent three full seasons (1969–71) on the major league roster as the team's fourth outfielder. In , Stone reached career bests in games played (123), hits (84), doubles (12), triples (five), home runs (three), runs batted in (39) and batting average (.262). He started 76 games.

All told, Stone appeared in 388 games, and collected 194 hits, with 28 doubles, eight triples and six home runs. He drove in 89 runs and batted .241 lifetime.

References

External links

1942 births
Living people
Baseball players from California
Elmira Pioneers players
Eugene Emeralds players
Fox Cities Foxes players
Kansas City Athletics players
Major League Baseball outfielders
Omaha Royals players
Philadelphia Phillies players
Rochester Red Wings players
Sacramento State Hornets baseball players
Stockton Ports players
Tri-City Atoms players